Torsten May (born September 10, 1969 in Glauchau, Saxony) is a former German boxer, who won the Light Heavyweight Gold medal at the 1992 Summer Olympics. He challenged once for the IBF cruiserweight championship in 2006.

Amateur career
1991 German National Light Heavyweight champion
1991 Won World Championship as a Light Heavyweight in Sydney, Australia. Results were:
Defeated Patrice Aouissi (France) points
Defeated Orestes Solano (Cuba) points
Defeated Mehmet Gurgen (Turkey) points
Defeated Andrey Kurnyavka (Russia) points
Olympic Gold Medalist in Barcelona 1992 as a Light Heavyweight. Results were:
Defeated Gil-Nam Kim (North Korea) points
Defeated Dale Brown (boxer) (Canada) points
Defeated Montell Griffin (United States) when controversially he was credited some of Griffin's points
Defeated Wojciech Bartnik (Poland) points
Defeated Rostislav Zaulitchny (Unified Team/ C.I.S) points

Professional career
May began his professional career the following year and won his first 15 bouts in the cruiserweight division, setting up a fight for the vacant IBF cruiserweight title against Adolpho Washington.  Washington won by a narrow unanimous decision, a loss which May avenged in 1999 via a 9th round technical decision after Washington lost his title.  May never again fought for a title, and lost via TKO in the 8th round to Alexander Gurov in 2001 in a match that ended May's career.

Professional boxing record

|-
|align="center" colspan=8|22 Wins (12 knockouts, 10 decisions), 3 Losses (2 knockouts, 1 decision) 
|-
| align="center" style="border-style: none none solid solid; background: #e3e3e3"|Result
| align="center" style="border-style: none none solid solid; background: #e3e3e3"|Record
| align="center" style="border-style: none none solid solid; background: #e3e3e3"|Opponent
| align="center" style="border-style: none none solid solid; background: #e3e3e3"|Type
| align="center" style="border-style: none none solid solid; background: #e3e3e3"|Round
| align="center" style="border-style: none none solid solid; background: #e3e3e3"|Date
| align="center" style="border-style: none none solid solid; background: #e3e3e3"|Location
| align="center" style="border-style: none none solid solid; background: #e3e3e3"|Notes
|-
|Loss
|
|align=left| Alexander Gurov
|TKO
|8
|21/04/2001
|align=left| Erfurt, Germany
|align=left|
|-
|Win
|
|align=left| Yan Kulkov
|PTS
|8
|25/11/2000
|align=left| Hannover, Germany
|align=left|
|-
|Win
|
|align=left| Valeri Semiskur
|TKO
|3
|03/06/2000
|align=left| Karlsruhe, Germany
|align=left|
|-
|Win
|
|align=left| Alexey Ilyin
|MD
|12
|27/11/1999
|align=left| Düsseldorf, Germany
|align=left|
|-
|Win
|
|align=left| Adolpho Washington
|TD
|9
|05/06/1999
|align=left| Frankfurt, Germany
|align=left|
|-
|Win
|
|align=left| Pascal Warusfel
|PTS
|10
|10/10/1998
|align=left| Vienna, Austria
|align=left|
|-
|Loss
|
|align=left| Stefan Angehrn
|TKO
|9
|13/12/1997
|align=left| Düsseldorf, Germany
|align=left|
|-
|Win
|
|align=left| Matthew Charleston
|TKO
|5
|18/10/1997
|align=left| Vienna, Austria
|align=left|
|-
|Win
|
|align=left| Jason Nicholson
|PTS
|10
|15/02/1997
|align=left| Vienna, Austria
|align=left|
|-
|Loss
|
|align=left| Adolpho Washington
|UD
|12
|31/08/1996
|align=left| Palma de Mallorca, Spain
|align=left|
|-
|Win
|
|align=left| Andrew Maynard
|KO
|10
|20/04/1996
|align=left| Düsseldorf, Germany
|align=left|
|-
|Win
|
|align=left| Gary "Tiger" Steiger
|TKO
|6
|23/03/1996
|align=left| New York City, U.S.
|align=left|
|-
|Win
|
|align=left| Bobbie Joe Edwards
|PTS
|8
|29/01/1996
|align=left| Piccadilly, London, England
|align=left|
|-
|Win
|
|align=left| Art Jimmerson
|KO
|5
|09/09/1995
|align=left| Bielefeld, Germany
|align=left|
|-
|Win
|
|align=left| Tim "Scrap Iron" Johnson
|KO
|2
|17/06/1995
|align=left| Las Vegas, Nevada, U.S.
|align=left|
|-
|Win
|
|align=left| Fred "Kip" Adams
|KO
|3
|27/05/1995
|align=left| Dortmund, Germany
|align=left|
|-
|Win
|
|align=left| Saul Montana
|UD
|10
|25/03/1995
|align=left| Düsseldorf, Germany
|align=left|
|-
|Win
|
|align=left| Jason Waller
|TKO
|6
|26/11/1994
|align=left| Wuppertal, Germany
|align=left|
|-
|Win
|
|align=left| Dale "Lunch Pail" Jackson
|TKO
|5
|18/06/1994
|align=left| Chicago, Illinois, U.S.
|align=left|
|-
|Win
|
|align=left| Ralf Rocchigiani
|PTS
|10
|07/05/1994
|align=left| Koblenz, Germany
|align=left|
|-
|Win
|
|align=left| Tony "Phone" Booth
|UD
|6
|26/03/1994
|align=left| Dortmund, Germany
|align=left|
|-
|Win
|
|align=left| Vincent Boulware
|SD
|8
|26/02/1994
|align=left| San Jose, California, U.S.
|align=left|
|-
|Win
|
|align=left|Ludmil Popov
|KO
|1
|11/12/1993
|align=left| Düsseldorf, Germany
|align=left|
|-
|Win
|
|align=left| Bruce "The Truce" Johnson
|TKO
|4
|16/10/1993
|align=left| Koblenz, Germany
|align=left|
|-
|Win
|
|align=left| Eric "Ice" Cole
|KO
|1
|18/09/1993
|align=left| Düsseldorf, Germany
|align=left|

References

External links
 

1969 births
Living people
People from Glauchau
Boxers at the 1992 Summer Olympics
Olympic boxers of Germany
Olympic gold medalists for Germany
Cruiserweight boxers
Light-heavyweight boxers
Olympic medalists in boxing
Medalists at the 1992 Summer Olympics
German male boxers
AIBA World Boxing Championships medalists
Sportspeople from Saxony